Pitcairnia recurvata is a plant species in the genus Pitcairnia. This species is native to Mexico.

References

recurvata
Flora of Mexico